The Shanmuganathi Dam is built across the Shanmugha River near Rayapanpatty, in the Theni district of Tamil Nadu, southern India. It provides water for irrigation for the dry lands such as Pusarikoundan patti, Appipatti, SukkangalPatti, Vellaiammalpuram, Odaipatti and Sepalakottai of Theni district. This dam is more scenery and situated at the foot hill of Meghamalai mountain range just 4 km from Rayapanpatty Village near Uthamapalayam and just 2km from Anaipatty village.

References 

Dams in Tamil Nadu
Theni district
Year of establishment missing